Sernursky District (Šernur kundem) is an administrative and municipal district (raion), one of the fourteen in the Mari El Republic, Russia. It is located in the northeast of the republic. Its administrative center is the urban locality (an urban-type settlement) of Sernur. As of the 2010 Census, the total population of the district was 25,672, with the population of Sernur accounting for 33.8% of that number.

Administrative and municipal status
Within the framework of administrative divisions, Sernursky District is one of the fourteen in the republic. It is divided into 1 urban-type settlement (an administrative division with the administrative center in the urban-type settlement (inhabited locality) of Sernur) and 8 rural okrugs, all of which comprise 145 rural localities. As a municipal division, the district is incorporated as Sernursky Municipal District. Sernur Urban-Type Settlement is incorporated into an urban settlement, and the eight rural okrugs are incorporated into eight rural settlements within the municipal district. The urban-type settlement of Sernur serves as the administrative center of both the administrative and municipal district.

References

Notes

Sources

Districts of Mari El
